Listeria weihenstephanensis is a species of bacteria. It is a Gram-positive, facultatively anaerobic, non-motile, non-spore-forming bacillus. It is non-pathongenic and non-hemolytic. It was discovered in a Lemna trisulca plant in a pond in Bavaria, Germany. The species name reflects the region in which it was first isolated, and was first published in 2013.

References

External links
Type strain of Listeria weihenstephanensis at BacDive -  the Bacterial Diversity Metadatabase

weihenstephanensis
Bacteria described in 2013